Penicillium sacculum is an anamorph species of fungus in the genus Penicillium which produces the xanthone 1-hydroxy-3-methoxy-6-sulfo-8-methylxanthone. Penicillium sacculum was isolated from the halophyte plant Atriplex

References

Further reading 
 
 

sacculum
Fungi described in 1926